Zaw Linn Tun, also called Zaw Lynn Tun (born 23 March 1983) is Burmese footballer. He plays for club Yadanarbon in Myanmar National League as a defender. He was called to Myanmar national football team at the 2010 AFF Suzuki Cup and 2014 FIFA World Cup qualifiers.

References

External links 
 

1983 births
Living people
People from Tanintharyi Region
Burmese footballers
Myanmar international footballers
Association football defenders